Steenwijk is a railway station in Steenwijk, Netherlands. The station opened on 15 January 1868 and is on the Arnhem–Leeuwarden railway. Train services are operated by Nederlandse Spoorwegen.

Train services

Bus services

External links
NS website 
Dutch Public Transport journey planner 

Railway stations in Overijssel
Railway stations opened in 1868
Railway stations on the Staatslijn A
Steenwijkerland